Nohan Kenneh (born 10 January 2003) is a professional footballer who plays as a midfielder for Ross County, on loan from Hibernian. Born in Liberia, he was a youth international for England.

Early and personal life
Kenneh was born in Liberia, moving to the United Kingdom as a refugee at the age of six.

Club career
After playing for Bradford City and York City, Kenneh spent eight years with Leeds United, and was an unused first-team substitute on a number of occasions. He received a yellow card for his celebrations as an unused substitute in a Premier League match against Wolverhampton Wanderers.

Kenneh signed for Scottish club Hibernian in May 2022 on a three-year contract, with effect from 1 July. On 9 July 2022, he debuted for Hibernian during a 5–0 win over Clyde. On 13 August 2022, he scored his first professional goal in Hibernian's 2–1 loss away at Livingston in the Scottish Premiership. Kenneh was loaned to Ross County in January 2023.

International career
Kenneh represented England at under-16 and under-17 youth international levels. He was called-up by his native country Liberia in March 2023.

Style of play
Kenneh prefers to play as a holding midfielder, but he can also play in central defence.

Career statistics

References

2003 births
Living people
English footballers
England youth international footballers
Liberian footballers
English people of Liberian descent
Liberian emigrants to the United Kingdom
Bradford City A.F.C. players
York City F.C. players
Leeds United F.C. players
Hibernian F.C. players
Scottish Professional Football League players
Association football midfielders
Ross County F.C. players